This is a list of junior colleges in the United States. Most of these institutions are private; public two-year community colleges are excluded.

Arkansas
Crowley's Ridge College, Paragould

California
California Preparatory College, Redlands
Deep Springs College, Deep Springs Valley
Empire College, Santa Rosa
Marymount College, Rancho Palos Verdes
MTI College, Sacramento
 ELAC, East La College, Los Angeles, California

Colorado
Colorado School of Trades, Lakewood

Connecticut
Goodwin College, East Hartford
Lincoln College of New England, Southington
Hillyer College, University of Hartford, West Hartford
 St. Vincent's College, Bridgeport

Florida
Southwest Florida College, Fort Myers

Georgia
Andrew College, Cuthbert
Darton State College, Albany
Georgia Military College, Milledgeville
Oxford College, Oxford

Hawaii
TransPacific Hawaii College, Honolulu
Hawaii Tokai International College, Honolulu

Illinois
Joliet Junior College, Joliet – the nation's first junior college
Lincoln College, Lincoln

Indiana
Ancilla College, Donaldson
Vincennes University, Vincennes

Iowa
St. Luke's College, Sioux City

Kansas
Donnelly College, Kansas City
Hesston College, Hesston
Cloud County Community College, Concordia
Barton Community College, Great Bend
Coffeyville Community College, Coffeyville

Kentucky
St. Catharine College, Springfield

Maine
Andover College, Portland

Massachusetts
Bay State College, Boston
Fisher College, Boston
Labouré College, Boston

Minnesota
Maranatha Bible School, Lansing

Mississippi
Clarke College, Newton (defunct)
Jones County Junior College, Ellisville
Mary Holmes College, West Point (defunct)
Mississippi Industrial College, Holly Springs (defunct)
Wood Junior College, Mathiston (defunct)

Missouri
Cottey College, Nevada

New Hampshire
Mount Washington College, Manchester

New Jersey
Assumption College for Sisters, Denville

New Mexico
New Mexico Junior College, Hobbs

New York
Maria College, Albany
Trocaire College, Buffalo

North Carolina
Louisburg College, Louisburg
Montreat College, Montreat

Ohio
Chatfield College, St. Martin
Rosedale Bible College, Rosedale

Oklahoma
Bacone College, Muskogee
Hillsdale Free Will Baptist College, Moore

Pennsylvania
Harcum College, Bryn Mawr
Lackawanna College, Scranton
Lansdale School of Business, North Wales
Manor College, Jenkintown
Pennsylvania Institute of Technology, Media and Philadelphia
Valley Forge Military Academy and College, Wayne
Williamson Free School of Mechanical Trades, Media

South Carolina
Clinton Junior College, Rock Hill
Forrest Junior College, Anderson
Spartanburg Methodist College, Spartanburg

Tennessee
Daymar Institute, Nashville and Murfreesboro
Hiwassee College, Madisonville

Texas
Amarillo College, Amarillo
Brazosport College, Lake Jackson
Frank Phillips College, Borger
Jacksonville College, Jacksonville
Lon Morris College, Jacksonville
Odessa College, Odessa
Ranger College, Ranger
Southwestern Christian College, Terrell
Tyler Junior College, Tyler*

Utah
Snow College, Richfield
USU-College of Eastern Utah, Price

Vermont
Landmark College, Putney

Virginia
Richard Bland College, Petersburg

West Virginia
Huntington Junior College, Huntington
West Virginia Junior College, Bridgeport
West Virginia Junior College, Charleston
West Virginia Junior College, Morgantown

See also
List of community colleges

References

Junior colleges